Xu Xinwen (Chinese: 许馨文; born March 20, 1995) is a Chinese singer, dancer, and actress under Show City Times. She is known for participating in the 2020 girl group survival show Youth With You 2 and the 2018 survival show The Next Top Bang.

Early life 
Xu Xinwen was born on March 20, 1995 in Hengyang, Hunan, China. Originally a dancer, she decided to study music after hearing JJ Lin's music. She graduated from the Sichuan Conservatory of Music at the top of her major, majoring in pop singing.

Career 
In 2014, Xu won the Tian Yi Fei Young Campus Singers Contest, a national singing competition for college students.

In 2016, Xu won the finals of the Migu Music National College Student League, another national college singing competition, and also won the Most Popular Award. Subsequently, she signed a contract with Show City Times, and on August 23, 2016, she released her first single, "In the Zone", in a collaboration with rapper Alex Hong. The song was produced by Jane Zhang and was the theme song for the movie Southpaw, and an English version of the song was released on September 5 of the same year. On November 22, 2016, Xu performed "In the Zone", "If I Ain't Got You", and other songs in the City Voice Campus Welcome Concert in Chengdu. On November 25 of the same year, Xu participated in the reality music show Sound of My Dream, performing Jike Junyi's song "彩色的黑 (Colorful Black)" and JJ Lin's song "翅膀 (Wings)". Her performance was praised by the mentors JJ Lin and A-Mei as being "very powerful" and "well prepared, having a strong stage presence". Xu also participated in the Super Hi Christmas Music Party Concert in Chengdu on December 23, 2016, singing the songs "In the Zone" and "翅膀 (Wings)".

On March 27, 2017, Xu performed "In the Zone" at the 24th Oriental Billboard Music Festival and also won the "Oriental Newcomer Award". On April 30th, she performed "In the Zone" and Grand Funk Railroad's "Some Kind of Wonderful" at the 2017 Mount Emei Buddha Light Flower Sea Music Festival. She was also the opening act for Jane Zhang's 2017 MUSIC LOVE concert on May 19 in Guangzhou, performing "In the Zone" and "翅膀 (Wings)". On September 16, 2017, she performed "In the Zone" at iQIYI's 2017 Scream Night in Lanzhou.

On April 3, 2018, Xu released her first EP, "All My People", which consisted of the song "黑色外套 (Black Jacket)" as well as the English and Chinese versions of "All My People". On April 27, 2018, she released the single "Youth Anthem" with Alex Hong and Boss X, which was also featured in the "Vibe Presents Urban Asia, Vol. 1" compilation album by B2 Music. Later that year, on June 26, she released the OST  "爱最闪耀 (Love Shines the Most)" for Sweet Dreams (TV series), and on August 13, 2018, she released the OST "一生的挚爱 (Love of a Lifetime)" for the drama Swords of Legends 2. Also in 2018, Xu made her acting debut by starring as the character Niu Honghua in the drama Only Kiss Without Love. She then participated in the idol survival show The Next Top Bang in November 2018.

On January 26 of 2019, Xu performed "彩色的黑 (Colorful Black)" at the 2018 Fenghuang Network Annual Meeting. On June 29, 2019, Xu released the single "Some Hurts".

In January through May 2020, Xu participated in the girl group survival show Youth With You (season 2), in which she was eliminated in the 28th place despite being praised as the "top vocal" by mentor Ella Chen. On June 12, 2020, Xu released the single "Boomerang". On July 9, 2020, she released the OST "若 (If)" for the TV series Dance of the Sky Empire. In September 2020, Xu participated in Youku's live streaming reality survival show Go! Streamers. On October 14, she collaborated with UNINE's Xia Hanyu for the OST "奇妙反应 (Wonderful Reaction)" for the drama Meeting You. On October 15, 2020, she participated in episode 7 of THE9's variety show Let's Party, and on November 6, she participated in episode 5 of Youku's talk show Mars Intelligence Agency. She then released the OSTs "Can't Nobody Love Me Like Myself" and "我说的 (I Said)" on November 13 and December 11 of 2020 respectively, both for the drama Something Just Like This.

In January and February 2021, Xu Xinwen participated in episodes 5 and 6 of Mango TV's program Let's Go along with UNINE's Xia Hanyu. On May 3 of the same year, she performed her songs "Can't Nobody Love Me Like Myself", "黑色外套 (Black Jacket)", and "Boomerang" at the 2021 Pop Songs Charts concert in Suzhou and also won the "New Sound of the Year - Female Singer" award. Xu was announced to be filming for the drama Love in a Loop on July 5. Also, on July 30, an official work studio for Xu Xinwen was announced. On August 6, Xu released the song "The MVP", which was also the title track of her EP "爱人规则 LOVER GAME". An MV for "The MVP" was released on August 8. 

On March 20, 2022, Xu released the OST "如果" for the drama Maybe It's Love 2. On May 1, 2022, the drama Love in a Loop was broadcast on iQIYI and Tencent Video, with Xu Xinwen as the character Kong Feifei. On May 5, 2022, Xu Xinwen began filming for the movie To Be Continued. On May 10, Xu released the theme song "女士的法则" for the drama Lady of Law, and on September 21, Xu released the theme song "别害怕" for the drama So Young.

Awards and achievements

Discography

Extended plays

Singles

Youth With You (Season 2)

Filmography

Television series

Television shows

Fandom 
Name

 Mantianxin (Chinese: 满天馨); which means "sky full of xin" but is similar to the pronunciation of "sky full of stars" or baby's breath flowers ("满天星") in Chinese, with the "xin" (馨) character being the same as the one in Xu Xinwen's name.

References

External links 

 Xu Xinwen on Sina Weibo (in Chinese)
Xu Xinwen Work Studio on Sina Weibo (in Chinese)
 Xu Xinwen on Instagram
Xu Xinwen on Douyin (in Chinese)
Xu Xinwen on Xiaohongshu (in Chinese)

1995 births
Living people
People from Hengyang
Chinese pop singers
21st-century Chinese women singers
Chinese television actresses
21st-century Chinese actresses
Actresses from Hunan
Youth With You contestants
Sichuan Conservatory of Music alumni